The Commodore LCD (sometimes known in short as the CLCD) is an LCD-equipped laptop made by Commodore International. It was presented at the January 1985 Consumer Electronics Show, but never released.  The CLCD was not directly compatible with other Commodore home computers, but its built-in Commodore BASIC 3.6 interpreter could run programs written in the Commodore 128's BASIC 7.0, as long as these programs did not include system-specific POKE commands. Like the Commodore 264 and Radio Shack TRS-80 Model 100 series computers, the CLCD had several built-in ROM-based office application programs. 

The CLCD featured a 1 MHz Rockwell 65C102 CPU (a CMOS 6502 variant) and 32 KB of RAM (expandable to 64 KB internally). The BASIC interpreter and application programs were built into 96 KB of ROM.

References

External links 
Old-Computers.Com: Commodore LCD
Secret Weapons of Commodore: The Commodore LCD
 

Commodore computers
Early laptops
6502-based home computers
Prototypes